Simpsonichthys similis is a species of killifish from the family Rivulidae.
It is found in the São Francisco River basin of Brazil in South America. 

References

Costa, W.J.E.M., 2003. Rivulidae (South American Annual Fishes). p. 526-548. In R.E. Reis, S.O. Kullander and C.J. Ferraris, Jr. (eds.) Checklist of the Freshwater Fishes of South and Central America. Porto Alegre: EDIPUCRS, Brasil.

Simpsonichthys
Taxa named by Wilson José Eduardo Moreira da Costa
Taxa named by Steffen Hellner
Fish described in 1999